Matthew MacFadzean is an actor and writer. As an actor, he has worked at theatres across Canada, including both the Shaw and Stratford Shakespeare festivals, and on numerous TV shows.  He has written and produced ten plays, the most notable works including richardthesecond, and the multi-Dora award winning The Mill.  He attended McGill University, the National Theatre School of Canada, and studied television writing at the Canadian Film Centre.  He currently acts and writes for television.  He is the winner of many awards including the prestigious Fox Foundation Scholarship.  MacFadzean is the youngest of three children.

Filmography

Witness Insecurity - 2011
InSecurity - 2011
Rookie Blue - 2010
Human Resource - 2009
The B Team - 2009
Time Bomb - 2008
Nuremberg: Nazis on Trial - 2006
Sohni Sapna (Beautiful Dream) - 2005
Sohni Sapna - 2005

Murdoch Mysteries - 2004 - 2005
The Eleventh Hour - 2004
Street Time - 2003
Owning Mahowny - 2003
Mutant X - 2001-2002
You've Got a Friend - 2002
The Big Heist - 2001
Exhibit A: Secrets of Forensic Science - 1997

References

1972 births
Living people
Canadian male television actors
Canadian male film actors
Canadian male stage actors
20th-century Canadian dramatists and playwrights
21st-century Canadian dramatists and playwrights
McGill University alumni
Canadian Film Centre alumni
National Theatre School of Canada alumni
Canadian male dramatists and playwrights
20th-century Canadian male writers
21st-century Canadian male writers